Hellinsia morenoi is a moth of the family Pterophoridae. It is found in Ecuador.

The wingspan is 15 mm. Adults are on wing in December.

References

Moths described in 2011
morenoi
Moths of South America